Jean-Charles Thomas (born 16 December 1929 on Saint-Martin-des-Noyers) is a French Catholic Bishop. He was ordained on July 5, 1953 and was incardinated in the clergy of the Diocese of Luçon.

On 13 March 1972 he was named by Pope Paul VI, titular bishop of Gemellae in Numidia and appointed him auxiliary bishop in Aire and Dax. The bishop of Luçon, Mgr Charles-Auguste-Marie Paty, gave him on 1 May of the same year, the episcopal ordination; Co-consecrators were the Archbishop Marius-Félix-Antoine Maziers, and the Bishop André Pierre Louis Marie Fauchet. On 4 February he was named by Pope Paul VI Bishop of Ajaccio. Then he was named on 23 December 1986, Coadjutor bishop of Versailles, and Bischop of Versailles on the 4 June 1988. The 11 January 2001, the Pope Jean-Paul II accepted his demission and named Éric Aumonier to succeed him.

References

External links 
 Jean-Charles Thomas on catholic-hierarchy.org

 

 

1929 births
Living people
French Roman Catholic titular bishops
Bishops of Versailles
21st-century Roman Catholic bishops in France
Bishops of Ajaccio